Karimu Young (born 21 March 1942) is a Nigerian boxer. He competed at the 1960 Summer Olympics and the 1964 Summer Olympics. At the 1964 Summer Olympics, he defeated Cherdchai Udompaichitkul and Brunon Bendig, before losing to Washington Rodríguez.

References

External links
 

1942 births
Living people
Nigerian male boxers
Olympic boxers of Nigeria
Boxers at the 1960 Summer Olympics
Boxers at the 1964 Summer Olympics
People from Ilorin
Bantamweight boxers